Matthew Miller Dickerson (born November 9, 1995) is an American football defensive end for the Atlanta Falcons of the National Football League (NFL). He played college football at UCLA. He has also played for the Tennessee Titans and Las Vegas Raiders.

Early life
Matthew Miller Dickerson was born on November 9, 1995 in San Francisco, California to Pamela and Clarence Dickerson. Matt Dickerson grew up in San Mateo, California and attended Junípero Serra High School, where he excelled in football and basketball.

As a freshman on the football team, he led the Padres to an undefeated championship season in the WCAL. He was also named Most Valuable Player of his freshman basketball team.

As a sophomore on the football team, he started the season on the varsity team before being sent down to the junior varsity team. He was recalled to the varsity team for the CIF Central Coast Section playoffs in football and called up in basketball as well. The Padres had not won a CCS Championship in football since 1990. On December 3, 2011 at Terra Nova High School, in a 42-21 win over the Menlo-Atherton Bears, the Padres won their second CCS Championship and first at the Division One level.

As a junior on the football team, he was named All-WCAL Honorable Mention as a defensive lineman and tight end. As a junior on the basketball team, the Padres reached the WCAL and CCS Championship Finals against the Archbishop Mitty Monarchs who were led by All-American Aaron Gordon. On February 16, 2013 at Foothill College, Dickerson guarded Gordon in the WCAL Championship Final. In the first quarter, Gordon drove to the basket and was fouled on the way up and wound up on top of Dickerson. Gordon wrapped his arms around Dickerson's neck and then proceeded to stand up immediately. Players on the court from both teams were scattered around Dickerson and Gordon during the scuffle and the referees could not see them under the pile. They would both receive technical fouls.

Before Dickerson's senior football season, he was named a USA Today High School All-American as well as the number six rated prospect coming out of the San Francisco Bay Area. Dickerson studied precalculus under Serra Hall of Famer Joe Kmak. Dickerson would miss his entire senior season due to a back injury. Despite missing his senior season, the Padres would be named co-champions of the WCAL with Archbishop Mitty and would go on to defeat the Monarchs in the CCS Championship Final to win their first Sectional Open Division Championship in any sport and at any level. He was teammates in football and basketball with future NFL player Easop Winston.

College career
Dickerson appeared in 44 games (16 starts) for the Bruins over four seasons. Over the course of his career he recorded totaled 97 tackles, seven tackles for loss, four passes defensed and 1.5 sacks. Dickerson's senior season was cut short after a severe injury to his collarbone.

Professional career

Tennessee Titans
Dickerson signed by the Tennessee Titans as an undrafted free agent on May 11, 2018. He made his NFL debut on September 23, 2018 in a 9-6 win against the Jacksonville Jaguars. As a rookie, Dickerson played in three games with three tackles.

On October 19, 2019, Dickerson was waived by the Titans. He was re-signed on October 22, 2019. He was waived again on October 26, but re-signed two days later.

In the Wild Card round of the 2020 playoffs against the Baltimore Ravens, Dickerson recorded his first career sack on Lamar Jackson during the 20–13 loss.

Las Vegas Raiders
Dickerson signed with the Las Vegas Raiders on March 22, 2021. He was waived on August 31, 2021.

Arizona Cardinals
On November 2, 2021, Dickerson was signed to the Arizona Cardinals practice squad. He was released on November 15. He was re-signed on December 27. He signed a reserve/future contract with the Cardinals on January 19, 2022. He was released on July 29, 2022.

Kansas City Chiefs
On August 8, 2022, Dickerson signed with the Kansas City Chiefs. He was waived on August 30, 2022.

Atlanta Falcons
On August 31, 2022, Dickerson was claimed off waivers by the Atlanta Falcons.

Personal life
Dickerson originally committed to play for Notre Dame. However, his father, Clarence, who played college football at Henderson State in Arkansas, was diagnosed with prostate cancer before Dickerson left for South Bend. Because of this, Dickerson decided to stay in-state to play for the Bruins to be an hour flight from home rather than across the country. His father is in remission. Dickerson has a twin sister named Megan and enjoys fishing and golfing.

References

External links
Titans bio
UCLA bio

1995 births
Living people
American football defensive ends
Arizona Cardinals players
Atlanta Falcons players
Junípero Serra High School (San Mateo, California) alumni
Kansas City Chiefs players
Las Vegas Raiders players
People from San Mateo, California
Players of American football from California
Sportspeople from the San Francisco Bay Area
Tennessee Titans players
UCLA Bruins football players